The Little Owyhee River is a  long tributary of the South Fork Owyhee River.

See also
List of rivers of Nevada
List of rivers of Idaho
List of longest streams of Idaho

References

External links
Owyhee Watershed Council

Owyhee River
Rivers of Idaho
Rivers of Nevada
Rivers of Elko County, Nevada
Rivers of Humboldt County, Nevada
Rivers of Owyhee County, Idaho